Heřmaň is the name of several locations in the Czech Republic:

 Heřmaň (České Budějovice District), a village in the South Bohemian Region
 Heřmaň (Písek District), a village in the South Bohemian Region